WSDC may refer to:

 World Schools Debating Championships, a high-profile annual English-language debating tournament for high school-level teams representing different countries
 WSDC (FM), a radio station (88.5 FM) licensed to Sneedville, Tennessee, United States